IBM Cloud and Smarter Infrastructure group is an umbrella of computer system solutions from IBM that includes data storage management, enterprise asset management and IT Service Management. In April 2013, IBM renamed its former Software Group division “Tivoli Software” to “Cloud & Smarter Infrastructure”.

Cloud & Smarter Infrastructure group consists of a range of IT operations and Systems Management technology including the following IBM portfolio:
Tivoli, Maximo, Tririga, Endpoint Manager, Netcool and SmartCloud service management offerings

References

 streym
 Worldwide Data Protection and Recovery Software 2013–2017 Forecast and 2012 Vendor Shares
 IBM's Systems and Technology Group Looks to Analytics, Cloud, and Smarter Planet Solutions for Faster Growth
 Cloud, Infrastructure and Economics
 Solutions for a smarter planet
 SearchDataCenter.com
 Service Management 360 News Flash: IBM’s Tivoli division, now IBM Cloud & Smarter Infrastructure
 Bye-Bye Tivoli, Welcome Cloud and Smarter Infrastructure: A New Brand in IBM, Jeremy Geelan 
 SiliconANGLE: A Name Change for Tivoli Proves New Focus on Smarter Infrastructure 
 The Merge technology was bought by a company called DASCOM in 1999 which was in turn bought by IBM 
 IBM grabs Think Dynamics

List of IBM Tivoli products
 IBM Tivoli Storage Manager
 IBM Tivoli Storage Manager FastBack
 IBM Tivoli Workload Scheduler LoadLeveler
 Tivoli Endpoint Manager
 IBM OMEGAMON
 IBM Tivoli Workload Scheduler
 Tivoli Service Automation Manager
 IBM Tivoli Management Framework
 IBM Tivoli Configuration and Change Management Database

Cloud and Smarter Infrastructure
IBM acquisitions